Wasfia Nazreen is a Bangladeshi mountaineer, activist, environmentalist, social worker and writer. She is the first Bangladeshi and first Bengali to complete the Seven Summits, on 18 November 2015. National Geographic recognized Nazreen as one of their Adventurers of the Year 2014/2015. She was selected in honor of her activism and commitment to empowering women through her work in the field of adventure. She was again selected as one of their Explorers in 2016. becoming the only woman to hold the simultaneous titles of National Geographic Explorer and Adventurer. She is the first Bangladeshi to scale the world's second highest and most dangerous peak, K2.

She was named by Outside as one of 40 women in the last 40 years who have advanced and challenged the outdoor world through their leadership, innovation, and athletic feats, and by Men's Journal as one of the 25 most adventurous women of the past 25 years.

Nazreen is also known for her campaigns to raise awareness of animal rights, human rights situations in Tibet, environmental impacts, Bangladeshi women's rights (including of sex workers and garments factory workers) and Indigenous groups. Nazreen is credited in Bangladesh history as the nation's inspiration and one of the legendary women to have made pioneering contribution.

In December 2019, Nazreen was featured in UN Women's "Generation Equality" campaign. In March 2021, Nazreen was one of the activists to launch UNESCO's worldwide Forum on Biodiversity.

Early life and education

Early years 
Nazreen was born Wasfia Nazreen Chowdhuryin in Dhaka. She is the youngest child and only daughter of Mahmuda Nahar (Ruby), a musician and teacher, and Nazmee Jahan Chowdhury, an executive at James Finlay Bangladesh. Nazreen lived in Khulna, where she studied at Sunflower Nursery school and then Coronation Girls’ High School. When she was still a child, the family moved to their previous home in Chittagong. There she studied in Bangladesh Mahila Samiti Girls' High School (BWA). In early 1996, when Nazreen was thirteen, her parents officially divorced, following which she went to live with her aunt, Chobi Rouf, and uncle, NAT Rouf, in Dhaka where she was enrolled in the English medium Scholastica school. At this point, she was separated from both her parents as well as her only sibling and elder brother, Sarwar N. Chowdhury, who stayed in Chittagong with their father. Nazreen competed in volleyball and handball alongside studying theatre in high school. She was in the first batch of now popularly known Prachyanat School of Acting and Design.

When Nazreen went to the United States for college on her own, she took off her family last name from all official papers. She credits her childhood as the most impactful time of her life.

Nazreen was trained in classical music and dance from a young age but discontinued practice after her mother, who was also her first teacher, left the family.

Education

Nazreen had to take care of herself from a very young age because of certain tragic circumstances in her childhood. This also made her realize early that the only way to set herself free, and to be independent, would be to educate herself.

Nazreen received a scholarship to Agnes Scott College (ASC), a private women's college in Decatur, Georgia. Nazreen left Bangladesh with the intention to pursue a double major in Theatre and Aeronautical Science. In her first semester, Nazreen played in her university's volleyball team and toured for the NCAA (National Collegiate Athletic Association), but she dropped volleyball in third year, when she struggled to keep up with her academic grades. By her second year, she switched to double majoring in Studio Art and Social Psychology.

Outside the university, Nazreen was involved with African Dance Theatre part-time.

Nazreen was a distant scholar at Samye Ling College of Scotland.

While still in college, Nazreen received a grant to go to India and research how women were using art as therapy. In Dharamsala, she started working with Tibetan women who had gone through torture in their lives at Chinese prisons. She describes it as a "life-altering experience" for her where "forgiving your enemies and really embodying that principle in your day-to-day life" was something that was very new to her. Following graduation, she decided to quit her work in the United States and moved to the Himalayas to work with refugees.

Work, activism and climbing
Nazreen was chosen as the first Goodwill Ambassador of BRAC (NGO), an international development organization. She was also the youth ambassador for JAAGO Foundation and its concern Volunteer for Bangladesh. In 2011, Nazreen was part of the Indigenous Peoples delegates at the United Nations Permanent Forum on Indigenous Issues (UNPFII). She is part of the Save Sundarbans movement, and was a critical voice to pressure the GOB and other concerned bodies in cleaning up efforts following the disastrous oil-spill of 2013/4.

Nazreen worked for the international humanitarian aid group CARE (relief agency). When the funding for one of CARE's projects dried up, Nazreen decided that while foreign support had its role in the developing nation, it was time for the Bangladeshi people to begin building aid organizations that were not headed by foreigners. She had begun mountaineering in 2006 while working in Tibet to stem human rights violations by the Chinese government. She decided to combine her two passions—activism and climbing.

Since finishing climbing the seven summits, Nazreen has been hard at work on her Ösel Foundation, which she describes as an “educational institute set in the outdoors, which integrates the latest scientific findings about the development of the mind and combines it with mindfulness techniques and training in nature to empower adolescent girls.”

In 2016, Nazreen became the brand ambassador for Grameenphone, becoming the highest paid female athlete of Bangladesh and one of the highest paid athletes of the nation. During her two year contract with Bangladesh's largest telecommunications network, she used the platform to challenge social responsibility and holistic development of the society through Grameenphone’s various social initiatives like online schools, easy internet education for the common people, women empowerment and other development initiatives.

Nazreen represented Bangladesh in Nepal at the closing ceremony of the two Nation's first ever Business Forum in January 2016. Nazreen highlighted the power of youth and the importance of sustainability and respecting nature while developing infrastructure. The conference was closed with a recitation of her poem, written in Nepali, about the ancient connection of the rivers that connect her motherland Bangladesh with the Himalayas.

In July 2022, She became the first Bangladeshi to scale Pakistan's notorious K2, the world's second highest mountain.

Free Tibet 
Her work with Tibetan human rights took her to Dharamsala, Himachal Pradesh, the exiled-capital of the Tibetans, where she lived for several years in her early twenties. Since 2007, Nazreen has been banned from returning to Tibet by the Chinese government after she was found with a photo of the 14th Dalai Lama.

Nazreen was part of the international movement for greater freedom and better human rights conditions inside Tibet and some high-profile protests and uprisings, leading up to the 2008 Beijing Olympic Games, including the March to Tibet protest in solidarity with 2008 Tibetan Uprising and several concerts and other events throughout the globe.

She was also an active member of Students for a Free Tibet (SFT) and the National Director of SFT in Bangladesh.

In 2009, with pressure from the Chinese Embassy in Bangladesh, her photography exhibition titled "Into Exile: Tibet 1949-2009" in partnership with DRIK, was shut down in Dhaka. The exhibition was still shown online while riot-geared police barricaded the premises and audience waited in the streets and consequently, she was intimidated and harassed for months by authorities and intelligence in her country.

Bangladesh on Seven Summits
On 26 March 2011, to celebrate 40 years of Bangladeshi independence, Nazreen launched the "Bangladesh on Seven Summits" Campaign. For the campaign, she has climbed each of seven continental summits to mark 40 years of women's progress in Bangladesh. The campaign received widespread support from the mass and was run completely independent of any political support, contrary to various claims made in the media by a number of Ministers in the Bangladesh Government. Among notable civilians, cricketers from the Bangladesh national team supported by advocating in their own rights; most outspokenly, Shakib Al Hasan, world's number one all-rounder and Mashrafe Mortaza, the captain of the Bangladesh national cricket team.

Many other notable individuals, including Sir Fazle Hasan Abed, Professor Muhammad Yunus, and the 14th Dalai Lama, were her outspoken supporters throughout the campaign.

Nazreen started trekking to base-camp of Everest on 26 March 2012 to mark Bangladesh's Independence day.

On 18 November 2015, Nazreen reached the summit of Carstensz Pyramid, the summit of Oceania, completing a four years long journey to the Seven Summits. She became the first Bangladeshi and first Bengali in the world to do so. She dedicated it to the “Spirit of 1971 Liberation War of Bangladesh and all those who are fighting to protect it." Nazreen dedicated her successful Everest climb to the women of Bangladesh, saying: "We have achieved independence 41 years ago, but our women are yet to enjoy freedom".

Nazreen became the first Bangladeshi to summit Aconcagua, South America’s highest peak and the highest peak outside of Asia. She is also the first Bangladeshi to summit Denali, North America’s highest peak, Mt.Elbrus, Europe’s highest mountain, Vinson Massif, Antarctica’s highest mountain and Carstensz Pyramid, Oceania's highest mountain. Nazreen has several more mountains and volcanoes under her belt which she summited as a first Bangladeshi.

Patrick Morrow, the first person in the world to have climbed the highest peaks of all seven continents (in accordance with the Messner list) has overseen her training for seven summits.

Nazreen was invited by the House of Commons in UK Parliament in 2014 to share her journeys with the British Member of Parliaments.

Free Shahidul Alam 
In 2018, Nazreen was a vocal activist in the international "Free Shahidul" campaign to free the renown jailed Bangladeshi journalist Dr. Shahidul Alam. One of the protests outside the Headquarters of the UN that she had organized were met by violent thugs and opposition. Nazreen managed to get a permit the following day and flew a plane carrying a message that had an image of Shahidul reading “#FreeShahidulAlam”, as well as a text banner saying “Free Our Teachers #Bangladesh #UNGA” in New York skyline, traversing the Statue of Liberty, while the United Nations General Assembly was in effect. This followed a weekend of demonstrations and talks held at various parts of the city calling for greater press freedom in Bangladesh, particularly addressing the case of Shahidul, who was picked up by plainclothes men in Dhaka, and sent to jail in a case filed under the ICT Act.

Personal
Nazreen is vegan and an advocate of animal-rights. She currently lives in Venice Beach, Los Angeles.

Nazreen likes to stay private and has often been quoted to say she shies away from social-media and the spotlight. She is dubbed in Bangladeshi media as a fashion icon and role-model.

A long-time supporter of Tibet, Nazreen is close friends with the 17th Karmapa Ogyen Trinley Dorje and the 14th Dalai Lama, Tenzin Gyatso. She credits them in interviews as the two most important teachers in life who has shown her the way when she was derailed in life. Nazreen openly discusses accounts of dealing with depression and trauma as a child following her parents divorce that made her homeless as a result. She credits such struggle at early life for giving her "abilities to bounce back after adversities and greet change and difficulties as an opportunity to welcome greater self-reflection, learning, and growth." She studied meditation with Tibetan teachers Dilgo Khyentse Yangsi Rinpoche and Yongey Mingyur Rinpoche.
Life is meditation–it’s not a separate thing. The essence of meditation is recognizing awareness. If we’re not aware, we cease to exist. Yoga, meditation, mindfulness—these are like compasses when we’re lost at sea. Thanks to my mother, I was born into yoga. And then later in my adult life I have been extremely blessed not only to be directly guided by some of the most profound teachers of our times, but also to work in movements and environments led by HH the Dalai Lama and HH the Karmapa, and experientially learn how great beings like them who also went through so much atrocities in their personal lives—deal with it all, behind the limelight. Whenever I have (in the past) got derailed somehow, they’ve pulled me out, often in miraculous ways. So having this circle of family, and the particular purpose I have–I’m really blessed and I wouldn’t in my awakened mind for a second want to imagine it any other way.
Nazreen was diagnosed with COVID-19 in March 2020 and during which, she used the platform to send positive messages and advocated for mental health, by going on podcasts and live shows with notable personalities such as cricketers, actors and astronauts. She was one of the first Bangladeshis to have gotten diagnosed while being abroad.

In 2020, in the Bruce Lee Podcast, she stressed about the importance of mental-health and ancestral trauma healing, and how individual mental-health is directly linked with the health of our planet.

Relationship with nature 
Nazreen is often quoted in TV and other media requesting against labeling her mountaineering expeditions as a "conquering" feat due to its colonial and patriarchal nature.

Wasfia in books and documentary
 Nazreen and her quests are subjects of HSC exam quizzes and various other school textbook contents in Bangladesh.
 Nazreen's philosophy of life is featured among five of the most adventurous souls in National Geographic's Special Publication “Adventures of a Lifetime.”
 Nazreen is the subject of the 2016 documentary Wasfia made by Apple Inc. and produced by Academy Awards nominated RYOT Films. The documentary was shot on the iPhone 6s and premiered at the Telluride Mountainfilm festival same year. The documentary was on tour around the world and was shown as part of the National Geographic Short film Showcase. It received critical acclaim internationally, including a nomination for the prestigious Tribeca-X award at the 2017 Tribeca Film Festival and The New York Times calling it a bait for the Academy Awards.
 Nazreen is one of the subjects in Astronaut Ronald J. Garan Jr.'s book The Orbital Perspective. “What really struck me in Wasfia’s description of her experience was that overriding feeling of gratitude, which in some way connected her to every single being. This was exactly what I experienced in space: immense gratitude for the opportunity to see Earth from this vantage, and for the gift of the planet we’ve been given. In some way I can’t explain, being physically detached from Earth made me feel deeply interconnected with everyone on it. I distinctly remember this feeling of profound thankfulness, but Wasfia’s words helped me to process that awareness of interconnectedness with the inhabitants of the planet.”
 Nazreen is one of the twelve Women Explorers to grace National Geographic's 2020 Explorer calendar.

Awards and honors

 Prime Minister of Bangladesh Sheikh Hasina's National Honor, 2012
 Former PM and Opposition Party Leader of Bangladesh Khaleda Zia's Honor, 2012
 Nobel Peace Prize Recipient Muhammad Yunus's Honor, 2012
 Female Pioneer Award by Prime Minister's Office, Bangladesh, 2013
 National Geographic Adventurer of the Year, 2014
 The Mayor's Medal of Honor, by Councillor of London Borough of Hounslow - first to be given to any female civilian, 2014
 Pioneer Athlete, Global Sports Mentoring Program, U.S. State Department and espnW, 2014
 Anannya Top Ten Awards, 2015
 Sri Chinmoy Torch Bearer award - for her commitment to non-violence strategic campaigns, 2015
 Outstanding Young Alumna Award, Agnes Scott College, 2016
 The Meeto Memorial Award for Young South Asians by SANGAT (South Asian Feminist Network)  - in recognition of her commitment to communal harmony, peace, justice, and human rights, 2016
 National Geographic Explorer, 2016
 Inspiring Woman of the Nation by Bangladesh Brand Forum, 2016
 Amelia Earheart Memorial Award by Zonta Bangladesh, 2016
 Icon of Bangladesh by Dhaka Chamber of Commerce and Industry, 2016
 People's Choice Award, National Geographic Explorers Symposium, 2016
 Young Global Leader, 2019 (unaccepted)

References

External links

 
 

1982 births
Living people
Summiters of the Seven Summits
People from Chittagong
Female explorers
Agnes Scott College alumni
Bangladeshi mountain climbers
Female travelers
Tibetologists
Bangladeshi social workers
Female climbers
Bangladeshi women's rights activists
Bengali people
Scholastica (school) alumni